The Moose Ponds are an expansion of the South Nahanni River just below its headwaters and are the starting point for 50 km of virtually continuous Class II - Class IV whitewater in Canada. This stretch of river is known locally as the Rock Gardens.  The ponds are mostly within the Northwest Territories, however a small portion of the largest and westernmost of the ponds does enter the Yukon.

References 

Lakes of the Northwest Territories
Lakes of Yukon
Nahanni National Park Reserve